The 2022 Zubr Cup was a professional tennis tournament played on outdoor clay courts. It was the eighteenth edition of the tournament which was part of the 2022 ITF Women's World Tennis Tour. It took place in Přerov, Czech Republic between 22 and 27 August 2022.

Champions

Singles

  Barbora Palicová def.  Sada Nahimana, 6–2, 1–6, 6–0

Doubles

  Anastasia Dețiuc /  Miriam Kolodziejová def.  Funa Kozaki /  Misaki Matsuda, 7–6(7–4), 4–6, [10–5]

Singles main draw entrants

Seeds

 1 Rankings are as of 15 August 2022.

Other entrants
The following players received wildcards into the singles main draw:
  Linda Klimovičová
  Barbora Palicová
  Dominika Šalková
  Linda Ševčíková

The following players received entry from the qualifying draw:
  Nikola Bartůňková
  Andrea Gámiz
  Oana Gavrilă
  Ilona Georgiana Ghioroaie
  Vera Lapko
  Ane Mintegi del Olmo
  Rina Saigo
  Julie Štruplová

References

External links
 2022 Zubr Cup at ITFtennis.com
 Official website

2022 ITF Women's World Tennis Tour
2022 in Czech sport
August 2022 sports events in the Czech Republic